Dominic Alexander Barclay (born 5 September 1976) is an English footballer who played as a forward in the Football League.

References

External links

1976 births
Living people
English footballers
Association football forwards
Bristol City F.C. players
Bangor City F.C. players
Macclesfield Town F.C. players
Kettering Town F.C. players
Chippenham Town F.C. players
Gloucester City A.F.C. players
Sutton United F.C. players
English Football League players
Footballers from Bristol